Tormmentor may refer to: Banda de heavy metal Riojano Argentino

Wiktionary definition 
 A tormentor is a person who torments and cause suffering.

Musical projects
 Tormentor (band), a Hungarian black metal band
 Tormentor (musician), a Norwegian black metal musician

Songs
 "Tormentor" (song), a 1990 single by the Canadian electro-industrial band Skinny Puppy